Terje Sørvik (born 4 June 1967) is a Norwegian politician.

He was elected representative to the Storting from the constituency of Nord-Trøndelag for the period 2021–2025, for the Labour Party. He was deputy representative to the Storting for the periods 2009–2013 and 2013–2017.

References

1967 births
Living people
Labour Party (Norway) politicians
Politicians from Nord-Trøndelag
Members of the Storting